The Hong Kong and Macau Affairs Office of the State Council is an administrative agency of the State Council of the People's Republic of China responsible for promoting cooperation and coordination of political, economic and cultural ties between Mainland China and the Chinese Special Administrative Regions of Hong Kong and Macau.

Its head office is in Xicheng District, Beijing.

Administration 
The agency was established in 1978, and has been headed by the Director of the Hong Kong and Macau Affairs Office. There are deputy directors which assist the director in running the office.

The agency answers to the State Council of the People's Republic of China as well as the Central Leading Group on Hong Kong and Macau Affairs of the Chinese Communist Party.

Primary Functions 
The Hong Kong and Macau Affairs Office (HKMAO) is an administrative agency of the State Council of the People’s Republic of China (PRC). It is mainly responsible for promoting cooperation and coordination of political, economic, and cultural ties between Mainland China and the Special Administrative Regions of Hong Kong and Macau.

According to Hong Kong and Macao Affairs Office of the State Council, The agency’s main functions are:

 To conduct research on various aspects of Hong Kong and Macao;
 To plan and coordinate the official contacts between different mainland departments and localities - and also with the HKSAR and MCSAR;
 To maintain contact with the Chief Executive and government of the HKSAR - and of the MCSAR;
 To promote and coordinate cooperation and exchanges in fields such as economics, science, technology, education and culture between the mainland and the two SARs of Hong Kong and Macao;
 To examine applications, approve and issue ravel documents for public servants heading to HK and Macao;
 To participate the management of service export to and mainland companies in HK and Macao;
 To promote the Basic Laws of HKSAR and MCSAR, as well as the principles and policies of the central government concerning HK and Macao.

Ho (2020) posited the importance of understanding the differences in the roles of the Hong Kong and Macao Affairs Office of the State Council and those of the Liaison Office of the Central People’s Government in the Hong Kong Special Administrative Region (HKSAR). Both organisations’ nature dictates the developments in Hong Kong and the smooth functioning of “one country, two systems” (OCTS) policy.

According to Ho (2020), HKMAO do not possess the authority or executive power with which they can intervene in Hong Kong affairs. On the contrary, the executive branch of the central government of the PRC is made up of 26 constituent departments of the State Council, comprising 21 ministries, such as the Ministry of Education and the Ministry of Public Security; three commissions such as the Commission on Development and Reform and the Commission on Health; the central bank, the People’s Bank of China; and the National Audit Office. Overall, these units can formulate and implement policies. Hence, HKMAO have the right to express concerns, but does not constitute to an intervention in the internal affairs of Hong Kong and Macau.

List of directors 

Current director Xia Baolong also holds the position of Vice Chairman of the National Committee of the Chinese People's Political Consultative Conference, becoming the highest-ranking official to hold the office in a decade.
Zhang Xiaoming was replaced by Xia and became deputy director of the office.

The office's Deputy Director, from December 2018, is Deng Zhonghua, a lawyer, born 1961.  Deng replaced Feng Wei, born September 1957 and seen by the Hong Kong democratic camp as someone they could talk with. His retirement was delayed by a year so that he could handle Beijing's concerns about 'independence' advocates in Hong Kong.

In March 2022, Wang Linggui replaced Deng Zhonghua as a deputy director, leaving a total of 5 deputy directors after the expected departure of Song Zhe.

Notably in 2020, the appointment of Xia Baolong over Zhang Xiaoming was seen as a stunning reshuffle within the HKMAO. Pao noted that Zhang Xiaoming, the original director of HKMAO, was demoted and re-appointed as the deputy director responsible for the daily operations with his ministerial rank intact.

Xia Baolong, the current director of HKMAO, also holds the position of Vice Chairman of the National Committee of the Chinese People’s Political Consultative Conference, thus, becoming one of the most highest-ranked official in the office for the past 10 years. According to Zheng and Xie (2020), Beijing has for the first time placed a state leader, Xia Baolong, in charge of the cabinet-level office that oversees the affairs of Hong Kong and Macau.

This move has not only strengthened the central government’s direct supervision over the implementation of its policies in Hong Kong and Macau, reduced incumbent chief Zhang Xiaoming’s authority in an unexpected demotion, but also a countermeasure to ensure civil obedience after months of social turmoil and anti-government protests in Hong Kong. Pao also posited that the leadership change was a significant move that aimed to upgrade the status of the HKMAO – now led by a director at deputy national level and three deputy directors at ministerial level. Cheng Yan — a columnist who wrote a commentary published on Orangenews.hk — also argued that these changes were parts of a proactive reform of the “one country, two systems” principle, and urged the Hong Kong society to take initiative to act in concert with China’s development and safeguard the “one country, two systems” principle in the city.

Department structure 
 Department of Secretary and Administration
 Department of General Affairs
 Department of Policy and Research
 Department of Liaison
 Department of Exchange and Cooperation
 Department of Law
 Institutional Party Committee (Department of Personnel)

From June 2017, discipline inspection within the office is handled by Pan Shengzhou.

Internal Bureaucracy 
The internal bureaucracy of the Hong Kong and Macau Affairs Office of the State Council adheres to the following hierarchical structure:

As of 2019, the internal bureaucracy of the Hong Kong and Macau Affairs Office was expanded upon to include the departments of National Security Affairs and Propaganda.

External Bureaucracy 
The external bureaucracy of the Hong Kong and Macau Affairs Office operates in accordance with the principle of Nomenklatura, with positions under this system assigned under the criteria of reliability, political attitude, qualifications and administrative ability by the bureaucracy of the Chinese Communist Party.

Whilst subordinate to the Chinese Communist Party, the Hong Kong and Macau Affairs Office also is subject to the authority of the Party’s Central Foreign Affairs Leading Small Group within the decision making process.

Within this system, the Hong Kong and Macau Affairs Office has the status of a governmental agency, maintaining authority below that of the Central Committee alongside other ministries such as the Ministry of Public Security, Ministry of Communications, Ministry of Commerce, and the Ministry of State Security.

Subordinate to these agencies is the structural economic bureaucracy, including the institutions of the Bank of China, People’s Bank of China and the state-owned enterprise of Everbright.

Ranked below are the party agencies including the Hong Kong and Macau Work Committee, which is directly subordinate to the Hong Kong and Macau Affairs Office.

(Image) Structure of the Communist Party’s Nomenklatura in Hong Kong

The elected party as a result of the Legislative Elections in Hong Kong is also classed as formally subordinate to the authority of the Hong Kong and Macau Affairs Office.

Relationship with the Hong Kong and Macau Work Committee 
The subordinate relationship between the Hong Kong and Macau Work Committee and the Hong Kong and Macau Affairs Office is one previously influenced by controversy.

This was a result of the chain of command, in which the individual bureaucratic rank of state council minister, the head of the Hong Kong and Macau Work Committee, Xu Jiadun, was equal to that of Ji Pengfei, the head of the Hong Kong and Macau Affairs Office. This allowed Xu to consequently bypass the authority of the Office, and discuss affairs directly with the Central Foreign Affairs Leading Small Group. As of 1990, the Work Committee was downgraded and tighter control of the Hong Kong and Macau Affairs Office was reinforced as to resolve the issue.

Statements on Western Influence 

The Hong Kong and Macao Affairs Office has issued statements in response to Western countries’ remarks on the political mechanisms in Hong Kong.

On 20 December 2021, G7, European Union (EU) and Five Eyes members issued public remarks to criticize the Legislative Council election. They described the electoral system as  ‘Beijing’s strategy  to ensure only “patriots” hold office and criticized the low turnout rate. Foreign ministers of the G7 and the High Representative of the European Union for Foreign Affairs Josep Borrell also issued a joint statement which said that ‘ democratic elements are eroded’ in Hong Kong. On the same day, the HKMAO issued a statement in rebuttal. Spokesman for the office said that western countries ‘disguised their interference in local affairs and purpose of destroying Hong Kong’s prosperity’ by claiming care and concerns over Hong Kong’s democratic development. The spokesman also said in the same statement that western countries have always offered a political platform for the anti-China gangs, incited them and provided capital support to them to organize illegal movements.

On 9 May 2022, G7 issued a press statement which expressed  “grave concern over the selection process” of Hong Kong’s new leader and described it as “part of an ongoing assault on political pluralism and fundamental freedoms”. The European Union (EU) has also expressed regrets on ‘ the violation of democratic principles and political pluralism’ in the chief executive(CE) election on 8 May, with EU’s top diplomat Josep Borell claiming it as ‘another step in the dismantling of the one country, two systems  principle’.

In response to these remarks, the HKMAO on the same day issued a statement defending the CE election. The spokesman for the office criticized the G7 and EU for ‘blatantly smearing Hong Kong’s election and meddling in Hong Kong issues and China’s domestic affairs’, ‘ignoring the facts that Hong Kong’s CE election was held in accordance with the laws and principles of fairness and impartiality,  election results  have commanded people’s respect and support  and  the atmosphere in Hong Kong society was united and delightful’.   The spokesman for the office also asked western countries not to interfere in Hong Kong affairs.

In face of western countries’ resolutions and sanctions imposed on Hong Kong,  the HKMAO has also issued statements in rebuttal.

On 19 November 2021, the United States passed the Hong Kong Human Rights and Democracy Act, a federal law that provides for sanctions relating to undermining fundamental freedoms and autonomy in Hong Kong and requires annual reports on Hong Kong autonomy to be made. On 20 November 2021, Yang Guang from the office made the remark that the US has ‘ignored China’s multiple objection, blatantly interfered in China’s internal affairs, contravened internal laws and principles of international relations and displayed dominance in the ugliest sense.’

On 20 January 2022, European Parliament passed a resolution condemning the deterioration of human rights in Hong Kong, including severe restrictions on freedom of expression, freedom of association and press freedom. European lawmakers also urged the European Commission and EU member states to impose sanctions on the city’s top officials and proposed a review of Hong Kong’s status at the World Trade Organization (WTO). On 21 January 2022, the HKMAO issued a statement describing the resolution as ‘ a rubbish paper’ a “smear on its democracy and freedom”. Spokesman for the office said that European countries were ‘trying to interfere in China’s internal affairs by pointing fingers at and derogating Hong Kong affairs’. The spokesman also remarked that China has ‘moved away from the era of national humiliation’ and ‘will not allow any blatant interference of local affairs.’

Controversy 
The scope of power enjoyed by the Hong Kong and Macau Affairs Office concerning local affairs was in controversy.

In April 2020, the HKMAO expressed approval of the Court of Appeal judgment upholding the constitutionality of the Emergency Regulations Ordinance and disapproval of certain current affairs in the Legislative Council. In another strongly-worded statement released by the Liaison Office, the HKMAO was recognised as one of ‘China’s top bodies overseeing the city’s affairs ‘ that  ‘is authorized by the central authorities to handle Hong Kong affairs’. The statement added that the HKMAO is entitled to supervise affairs in Hong Kong and make statements on issues on Hong Kong’s relationship with Beijing, ranging from the “correct” implementation of the Basic Law to matters pertaining to the overall interests of society.

Controversies as to whether the remarks made by the HKMAO constitute the violation of article 22 of the Basic Law had been stirred up. Article 22(1) of the Basic Law provides that: “No department of the Central People's Government and no province, autonomous region, or municipality directly under the Central Government may interfere in the affairs which the Hong Kong Special Administrative Region administers on its own in accordance with this Law.’ The Hong Kong Bar Association issued a statement describing the public comments issued by the HKMAO as an exercise of public authority, which had already contravened article 22(1).

In response to such controversies,  spokesman for the HKMAO said it is “inaccurate” to say the liaison office is bound by article 22 of the Basic Law. The local government had also issued a statement responding to media enquiries. In the statement, the government referred to article 22(2) of the Basic Law to explain the legal basis of HKMAO. It added that the office was entrusted with authority and responsibility to represent the Central government to express views and exercise supervisory power on major issues including those concerning the relations between the Central Government and the accurate implementation of the Basic Law. Therefore, the public remarks made by the HKMAO were legitimate and in accordance with the Basic Law.

In another public comment released by Professor Ho Lok Sang ,Head of the Department of Economics and Director of the Centre for Public Policy Studies at Lingnan University, the general public shall not ‘misunderstand the roles of the HKMAO’ He noted that difference between intervening in Hong Kong’s internal affairs and expressing concern over some troubling developments shall be drawn and whether an act committed by the HKMAO constitutes an intervention of the Basic Law shall be assessed by“When there is a substantive impact on the actual operation of the political system.”

The HKMAO issued a statement against pro-democracy figures who organized primaries for the Hong Kong Legislative Council in 2020, saying that it was "an unlawful manipulation of Hong Kong elections" and a "blatant challenge" to the Basic Law, despite the Basic Law's Article 68 stating that the ultimate goal is to have universal suffrage for all members of the Legislative Council.

In September 2022, deputy director Huang Liuquan, claimed that it was "inappropriate" to call a 113,000 people leaving Hong Kong in the last year as an emigration wave, and also said claims that the National Security Law "mainlandised" the city were inaccurate. The decrease in population was 1.6% from a year earlier, the largest drop since record keeping started in 1961. Huang said "Hong Kong's population drop is caused by various factors and there is no way to suggest that it is a result of an emigration wave."

See also 

 Central Coordination Group for Hong Kong and Macau Affairs
 Hong Kong Affairs Adviser
 Liaison Office of the Central People's Government in the Hong Kong Special Administrative Region
 Liaison Office of the Central People's Government in the Macao Special Administrative Region
 Taiwan Affairs Office

References

External links 
 Website of the Hong Kong and Macau Affairs Office 
 "Hong Kong and Macao Affairs Office of the State Council". english.www.gov.cn. Retrieved 16 May 2022
 Hong Kong and Macau Affairs Office. (n.d). Retrieved on 14 May 2022. https://en.wikipedia.org/wiki/Hong_Kong_and_Macau_Affairs_Office#List_of_directors  Ho, L.S. (April 21, 2020). Understanding the roles of the HKMAO and Liaison Office. China Daily. Retrieved on 14 May 2022. https://www.chinadailyhk.com/article/a/128157  Hong Kong and Macao Affairs Office of the State Council. (September 12, 2014). Retrieved on 14 May 2022. http://english.www.gov.cn/state_council/2014/10/01/content_281474991090982.htm   Hong Kong elections Spark G7, EU, Five eyes condemnation. South China Morning Post. (2021, December 21). Retrieved May 16, 2022, from https://www.scmp.com/news/china/politics/article/3160478/us-sanctions-five-chinese-officials-saying-hong-kong-elections   G7 foreign ministers' statement on Hong Kong legislative elections. G7 Foreign Ministers' statement on Hong Kong Legislative elections | EEAS Website. (n.d.). Retrieved May 16, 2022, from https://www.eeas.europa.eu/eeas/g7-foreign-ministers-statement-hong-kong-legislative-elections_en   国务院港澳事务办公室:国务院港澳办负责人就《"一国两制"下香港的民主发展》白皮书答记者问. (n.d.). Retrieved May 16, 2022, from https://www.hmo.gov.cn/xwzx/zwyw/202112/t20211220_23050.html   Lew, L. (2022, May 9). G7 expresses concern over Hong Kong leader's election. Time. Retrieved May 16, 2022, from https://time.com/6174800/g7-hong-kong-leaders-election/   Hong Kong's chief executive election a 'violation of democratic principles': Eu. South China Morning Post. (2022, May 8). Retrieved May 16, 2022, from https://www.scmp.com/news/china/article/3176985/eu-slams-selection-john-lee-hong-kongs-chief-executive-violation   国务院港澳事务办公室:国务院港澳办发言人：美西方少数国家的聒噪阻挡不了香港由治及兴的发展大势. (n.d.). Retrieved May 16, 2022, from https://www.hmo.gov.cn/xwzx/xwfb/xwfb_child/202205/t20220509_23321.html   張詩夢. (n.d.). 國務院港澳辦強烈抗議和譴責美國國會參議院通過"香港人權與民主法案". 國務院港澳辦強烈抗議和譴責美國國會參議院通過"香港人權與民主法案" - 中華人民共和國國防部. Retrieved May 16, 2022, from http://www.mod.gov.cn/big5/topnews/2019-11/20/content_4855266.htm   Texts adopted - digital services act ***I - Thursday, 20 January 2022. (n.d.). Retrieved May 16, 2022, from https://www.europarl.europa.eu/doceo/document/TA-9-2022-0014_EN.html   国务院港澳事务办公室:国务院港澳办发言人：欧洲议会所谓涉港决议是废纸一张、笑话一个. (n.d.). Retrieved May 16, 2022, from https://www.hmo.gov.cn/xwzx/xwfb/xwfb_child/202201/t20220121_23118.html   Ho, K. (2020, April 20). Gov't edits press release after contradicting Beijing on constitutional status of its Hong Kong office. Hong Kong Free Press HKFP. Retrieved May 16, 2022, from https://hongkongfp.com/2020/04/19/govt-edits-press-release-overnight-after-contradicting-beijing-on-constitutional-status-of-its-hong-kong-office/   The law of the people’s republic of china (“PRC”) on safeguarding ... (n.d.). Retrieved May 16, 2022, from https://www.hkba.org/sites/default/files/20200701%20HKBA%20statement%20on%20Safeguarding%20National%20%20Security%20in%20HKSAR.pdf   News, V. O. A. (2020, April 18). China top office in Hong Kong declares itself not bound by basic law. VOA. Retrieved May 16, 2022, from https://www.voanews.com/amp/east-asia-pacific_china-top-office-hong-kong-declares-itself-not-bound-basic-law/6187786.html   Understanding the roles of the HKMAO and Liaison Office. chinadailyhk. (n.d.). Retrieved May 16, 2022, from https://www.chinadailyhk.com/article/a/128157

State Council of the People's Republic of China
Government agencies of China
1978 establishments in China
Government agencies established in 1978